Manuel Llano may refer to:

 Manuel Llano (footballer) (born 1999), Argentine central midfielder
 Manuel Llano (tennis) (died 1931), Mexican tennis player